Tillatoba Creek is a stream in the U.S. state of Mississippi. It is a tributary to the Tallahatchie River.

Ittillittoba is a name derived from the Choctaw language purported to mean "white dead tree". Variant names are "Ittillittoba Creek", "Middle Tillatoba Creek", and "South Fork Tillatoba Creek".

References

Rivers of Mississippi
Rivers of Tallahatchie County, Mississippi
Rivers of Yalobusha County, Mississippi
Mississippi placenames of Native American origin